commonly known as Ehime FC (愛媛FC, Ehime Efu Shī) is a professional football club based in Matsuyama, the capital city of Ehime Prefecture of Japan.

History 
The club was founded in 1970 as Matsuyama Soccer Club and renamed itself as Ehime Football Club in 1995. For many years it competed in the regional and prefectural league, as Matsuyama was represented in the Japan Soccer League by the local club belonging to the Teijin company.

Ehime F.C. was promoted to the Japan Football League in 2003. After winning the JFL championship in 2005, Ehime spent 16 seasons in the J2 League before being relegated to the J3 League at the end of the 2021 season.

On November 28, 2007, Ehime pulled off a major shock by consigning the Urawa Red Diamonds, the AFC Champions League 2007 winners, to a fourth-round exit from the Emperor's Cup courtesy of a 2–0 win on Urawa's home soil, Urawa Komaba Stadium.

Record as J. League member 

Key

Honours 
Japan Football League: 2005
Shikoku Football League: 1998, 1999, 2000

Current squad 
As of 10 January 2023.

Kit evolution

Club officials
For the 2023 season.

Managerial history

References

External links 
  Official Site

 
J.League clubs
Football clubs in Japan
Association football clubs established in 1970
Sports teams in Ehime Prefecture
1970 establishments in Japan
Japan Football League clubs